William E. Klunk is an American psychiatrist and neurologist currently the Distinguished Professor of Psychiatry and Neurology and Levidow-Pittsburgh Foundation Chair in Alzheimer's Disease and Dementia Disorders at University of Pittsburgh.

He is one of the leading pioneers for in vivo amyloid imaging, which helps detect and quantify pathological protein aggregations in the brain of Alzheimer's patients.

References

University of Pittsburgh faculty
American psychiatrists
American neurologists
Year of birth missing (living people)
Living people
Washington University School of Medicine alumni
Shippensburg University of Pennsylvania alumni